Teribe most often refers to:

Teribe people, indigenous people of Central America
Teribe language, a Chibchan language originating in what is now northern Panama
Teribe River, a river of Panama.
Teribe is a town and corregimiento in the Changuinola District of Bocas del Toro Province of Panama.